Bethel Church may refer to:

Denominations
Gereja Bethel Indonesia

Individual church buildings and congregations
United States
 Bethel Church (Jacksonville, Florida)
 Bethel Church (Redding, California)
 Bethel United Methodist Church (Lake City, Florida)
 Bethel Church and Graveyard, Attica, Indiana
 Bethel Church (Morning Sun, Iowa)
 Bethel Church (Clay Village, Kentucky)
 Bethel Cemetery and Church, Falmouth, Kentucky
 Bethel Church (Labadie, Missouri)
 Bethel Church Arbor, Midland, North Carolina
 John Herrington House and Herrington Bethel Church, Mechanicstown, Ohio
 Bethel Church (Yale, South Dakota)
 Mount Bethel Church (Three Churches, West Virginia)

See also
 Bethel African Methodist Episcopal Church (disambiguation)
 Bethel Baptist Church (disambiguation)
 Bethel Methodist Church (disambiguation)
 Bethel Presbyterian Church (disambiguation)
 Bethel Chapel (disambiguation)
 Bethel (disambiguation)